Brett Clarke may refer to:

Brett Clarke (singer)
Brett Clarke (table tennis), represented Australia at the 2006 Commonwealth Games

See also
Brett Clark (disambiguation)